Edward Polo (born 10 October 1989, in Delta State) is a footballer, who plays for Bayelsa United.

References 

1989 births
Living people
Nigerian footballers
Association football forwards
Sportspeople from Delta State
Bayelsa United F.C. players